YooHoo to the Rescue is a computer animated children's television series produced by Aurora World and Mondo TV. It is the third TV series based on the YooHoo & Friends franchise, and serves as a revival of the franchise. The show is the first Netflix original series for children from South Korea.

In a series of magical missions, quick-witted YooHoo and his can-do crew travel the globe to help animals in need. It was released March 15, 2019 on Netflix.

Plot
YooHoo to the Rescue follows the adventures of five animal friends who live in the magical land of YooTopia, a land far outside the Milky Way. In each episode, they travel to a new destination to help animals in trouble and make new friends along the way. When there is a problem on YooTopia, the colorful fruits of the Sparkling Tree begin to fade. The friends get their special gadgets and board their ship Wonderbug, a ladybug-like aircraft. They use wit, teamwork, and special gadgets to solve problems and help animals in need. Over the course of their adventures, they learn fun facts about a wide variety of environments and make friends with animals.

Characters

 YooHoo (voiced by Kira Buckland; John Hasler in the UK dub) is a male cream-and-gray Senegal bushbaby. He is the captain of the crew.
 Pammee (voiced by Ryan Bartley; Jenny Bryce in the UK dub) is a female pink and white fennec fox. She is the navigator.
 Lemmee (voiced by Bryce Papenbrook; David Holt in the UK dub) is a male gray ring-tailed lemur. He is the doctor.
 Chewoo (voiced by Cassandra Lee Morris; Harriet Kershaw in the UK dub) is a female red squirrel. She is the photographer.
 Roodee (voiced by Lucien Dodge; Steven Kynman in the UK dub) is a male blond capuchin monkey. He is the inventor.
 Slo (voiced by Kyle Hebert; David Rintoul in the UK dub) is a male sloth. He is the caretaker of the Sparkling Tree.
 Lora (voiced by Erica Mendez; Tamsin Heatley in the UK dub) is a female scarlet macaw. She is YooTopia's messenger.

Production
YooHoo to the Rescue is produced by Aurora World in South Korea and Mondo TV in Italy. Unlike the previous TV series based on the YooHoo & Friends toy franchise, this series is computer animated. The series is recorded at Bang Zoom! Studios.

A British dub by VSI Studios was produced and released to Netflix.

Episodes

Season 1 (2019)

Season 2 (2019)

Season 3 (2020)

Release
YooHoo to the Rescue was released on March 15, 2019 on Netflix with the first 26 episodes.

Media information
Mondo TV secured a global licensing and merchandising deal with Panini that will market a line of products that include stickers, trading cards and photocards, set to launch in early 2018.

References

External links
 YooHoo to the Rescue on Mondo TV Iberoamerica
 
 YooHoo to the Rescue on Netflix

2010s South Korean animated television series
Italian children's animated adventure television series
Italian children's animated comedy television series
Italian children's animated fantasy television series
South Korean children's animated adventure television series
South Korean children's animated comedy television series
South Korean children's animated fantasy television series
English-language Netflix original programming
Animated television series about animals
Animated preschool education television series
2010s preschool education television series
Anime-influenced Western animated television series